Bunut may refer to:
 Bunut, Azerbaijan
 Bunut, Bushehr, Iran
 Bunut, Khuzestan, Iran
 Kampong Bunut, village in Brunei